Vedapatti is a suburb of Coimbatore in the Indian state of Tamil Nadu. It is the western suburb of Coimbatore, which was included with the Coimbatore Corporation limits in 2011.

Demographics
 India census, Vedapatti had a population of 9545. Males constitute 51% of the population and females 49%. Vedapatti has an average literacy rate of 68%, higher than the national average of 59.5%: male literacy is 73%, and female literacy is 62%. In Vedapatti, 10% of the population is under 6 years of age.

The valuable view of Vedapatti is it is standing amidst in the Perur to Marudamalai (both are very famous temple spots in Coimbatore) highway.

Soon the National Highways Dept is going to lay an outer-ring road for joining Palakkad-Ooty through Vedapatti.

It has the PSG Hospital & Rural Health Center belonging to the  famous PSG Groups of Coimbatore.

It has a PSG High School which is able to give  light to most of the villages around the Vedapatti. Here, the NEW LIFE PHYSIOTHERAPY AND SPORTS INJURY CLINIC provides health care for post operative condition, sports injury and physical illness.

Economy and education
Stanes Tea company's Stocking area is a landmark for Vedapatti.

The Real-Estate dealers like HareeShree Garden, SriRam Garden have initiated  Vedapatti as a comfortable area for living.

Prashanth Textiles Ltd a part of the PSG Group is a spinning unit manufacturing 100% cotton yarn established in the year 1957 is located in vedappati.

References

Cities and towns in Coimbatore district
Suburbs of Coimbatore